Thomas Nkuissi (July 7, 1928 – March 16, 2011) was the Roman Catholic bishop of the Roman Catholic Diocese of Nkongsamba, Cameroon, Africa.

Thomas Nkuissi was born on 7 July 1928 in Nkongsamba.
Ordained to the priesthood in 1958, Nkuissi became bishop of the Nkongsamba diocese in 1978 after serving as auxiliary bishop. 
He succeeded Bishop Albert Ndongmo in this position.  Ndongmo had resigned in 1973.
He resigned in 1992.

Notes

20th-century Roman Catholic bishops in Cameroon
1928 births
2011 deaths
People from Nkongsamba
Roman Catholic bishops of Nkongsamba